Unathi Elis Mali (born 3 December 1989) is a South African rugby sevens player.

Biography 
Mali competed for South Africa at the 2018 Commonwealth Games in Gold Coast, Queensland, Australia. She was named in South Africa's squad for the 2022 Commonwealth Games in Birmingham where they finished in seventh place. 

Mali was selected again to represent South Africa at the 2022 Rugby World Cup Sevens in Cape Town.

References 

Living people
1989 births
Female rugby sevens players
South Africa international women's rugby sevens players
Rugby sevens players at the 2022 Commonwealth Games